Ulrich Nganga (born 17 April 1970) is a British former professional tennis player.

Nganga, born to a Kenyan mother and German father, grew up in Norfolk and was trained at the LTA School, Bisham Abbey. He reached a career best singles ranking of 420 and was ranked as high as ninth in Britain. In 1990 he featured in his only Wimbledon main draw, partnering Jason Goodall in the men's doubles.

References

External links
 
 

1970 births
Living people
British male tennis players
English male tennis players
Tennis people from Norfolk
English people of Kenyan descent
English people of German descent